State Route 48 (SR 48) is a  east–west state highway located entirely in Chattooga County in the northwestern part of the U.S. state of Georgia. The highway connects the Alabama state line with Summerville, via Cloudland and Menlo.

Route description

SR 48 begins at the Alabama state line, where the roadway continues as Alabama State Route 117. This is located northwest of Cloudland. SR 48 travels southeast, into Cloudland, where it has an intersection with the southern terminus of SR 157. SR 48 then curves to the town of Menlo, where it intersects SR 337 (7th Avenue). SR 48 continues east, through rural areas of the county, to Summerville, where it meets its eastern terminus, an intersection with US 27/SR 1 in downtown.

While the route is short, SR 48 is a somewhat important route in the area. Between Menlo and Summerville, the route sees an Average Annual Daily Traffic (AADT) over 5,000 vehicles.

History

Major intersections

See also

References

External links

 Georgia Roads (Routes 41 - 60)
 Georgia State Route 48 on State-Ends.com

048
Transportation in Chattooga County, Georgia